The 2012–13 Calgary Flames season was the 33rd season in Calgary and the 41st of History the Flames franchise in the National Hockey League (NHL). The regular season was reduced from its usual 82 games to 48 due to the 2012–13 NHL lockout. Calgary recorded a 19–25–4 record under new head coach Bob Hartley that included a franchise record 13-game losing streak on the road. The Flames finished fourth in the Northwest Division, 13th in the Western Conference and failed to qualify for the 2013 Stanley Cup playoffs. It was the fourth consecutive season that team did not reach the playoffs.

It was a transitional season for the Flames. It marked the end of the Jarome Iginla era, after 17 years. Iginla is the franchise's all-time leader in games played, goals and points, and appearing once in the Stanley Cup Finals (2004). Following the long-time Flames captain's trade to the Pittsburgh Penguins, it marked the start of a rebuilding phase as the team brought in younger players. Defensive leader Jay Bouwmeester was also traded, while it was widely speculated in the media that it would also be goaltender Miikka Kiprusoff's final season in the NHL. By virtue of the trades, the Flames ended the season with three first round selections in the 2013 NHL Entry Draft.

Off-season
The Flames began the off-season searching for a new head coach after announcing they would not renew Brent Sutter's contract. As his replacement, the Flames hired Bob Hartley as the team's new head coach on May 31, 2012. Hartley had spent the 2011–12 season coaching the ZSC Lions to the Swiss National League A championship. At the time Hartley was hired, he had 658 career NHL games coached and led the Colorado Avalanche to the 2001 Stanley Cup championship. The hiring of Hartley brought additional changes to the team's coaching staff. Jacques Cloutier was brought in as an associate coach and Martin Gelinas was hired as an assistant coach. Assistant coach Craig Hartsburg was released by the organization.

2012–13 lockout
As the NHL Collective Bargaining Agreement (CBA) neared its expiry, a lockout appeared inevitable. The National Hockey League Players' Association (NHLPA) called a meeting for all players in New York for September 12 and 13, a date that coincided with the Flames' annual charity golf tournament, of which the players were featured participants. While fewer than half of the team's players were planning to attend the New York meeting, the players chose en masse to withdraw from the charity event. The decision resulted in widespread outrage by the team's fans, though Flames' management diplomatically expressed only regret that the players could not attend.  The team offered to refund all participants' $2,500 entry fee as a result.  Only one sponsor accepted, and was replaced by another. The backlash led the players to reverse their position within a day. Ten players, from the Flames active roster along with prospects, chose to attend the event.

The NHL locked out its players when the CBA expired at 10 pm Mountain Time on September 15.  Flames captain Jarome Iginla expressed regret that negotiations failed to resolve the impasse, and suggested that he would have been willing to miss an entire season if that was what it would have taken for the union to receive a "fair deal".  At the same time, several members of the Flames, along with their counterparts of the Edmonton Oilers, challenged the NHL's right to lock the players out, filing a complaint with the Alberta Labour Relations Board (ALRB). The board, however, rejected the players' application. The ALRB described the petition as an "unhelpful distraction" from the negotiating efforts of the league and its union.

While they waited for a resolution to the dispute, several Flames chose to play in Europe. Mikael Backlund returned to his hometown of Västerås, signing with VIK Västerås HK of the Swedish second division. He appeared in 23 games with the team and scored 30 points. Newcomer Roman Cervenka played first with Slavia Prague in the Czech Extraliga, and later Lev Prague of the Kontinental Hockey League (KHL), but left both teams due to injury. Two other players also went to the KHL: Anton Babchuk skated for HC Donbass while Jiri Hudler also played with Lev Prague.

The league and the players' union reached an agreement on January 7, 2013, that allowed for a shortened 48-game season. Both management and players expressed their regret to the fans for the length of the dispute. Team president Ken King and the team's union representative Matt Stajan apologized to the fans, while Iginla stated that "a simple apology doesn't cut it", and expressed his hope that the team could give the fans an exciting and entertaining product.

Regular season

The abbreviated season opened with five games in January and four of them on home ice. The Flames struggled during the month, posting only one victory against three losses in regulation and a shootout defeat that left the team in last place in the Western Conference entering February. The homestand ended with further frustration for the Flames as they lost to the Chicago Blackhawks, 3–2 in a shootout, despite outshooting their opponent 47–19. Chicago goaltender Ray Emery's performance was described as "criminal" by his head coach Joel Quenneville: "They've got to call the cops after that performance. (Emery) stole two points. He was spectacular." The Flames defeated the Detroit Red Wings on February 5 for their second win, but the victory came at a cost as starting goaltender Miikka Kiprusoff suffered an injury to his Medial collateral ligament. Injuries continued to impact the Flames' roster, as centre Mikael Backlund suffered a sprained knee in the following game, a 4–3 victory over the Columbus Blue Jackets, and was expected to miss at least four weeks.  Both Backlund and Kiprusoff were placed on injured reserve, joining Sven Baertschi (hip pointer).

The Flames spent the majority of February trying to move their record above .500. They evened their number of wins and losses on four occasions but lost their next game the first three times before making a fourth attempt against the Minnesota Wild at the end of the month.  As the Flames lost close games, Jarome Iginla's goal scoring struggles resulted in criticism directed at the Flames' captain, notably from former teammate-turned-radio host Rhett Warrener, who argued that Iginla had lost the ability to out-battle his opposition. Iginla brushed off the criticism while acknowledging he wasn't scoring as he had hoped with only one goal in the first month of the season. He had only two goals in 28 games dating back to the end of the 2011–12 season, but scored two to lead the Flames to a 5–4 come-from-behind victory over the Phoenix Coyotes on February 24 that evened Calgary's record at 7–7–3.

Having failed to complete a trade with the Colorado Avalanche for centre Ryan O'Reilly, a restricted free agent who was embroiled in a bitter contract dispute with Colorado, general manager Jay Feaster signed O'Reilly to an offer sheet worth $10 million over two years on February 28.  The Avalanche immediately exercised their right to match the contract and retained the player. Colorado's decision to match turned out to be a blessing for the Flames, as it was revealed the next day that since O'Reilly had played in Europe after the NHL season began, the Flames would have been required to place him on waivers upon signing him. It would have allowed any team to claim him without compensation while the Flames would still have lost their 2013 first and third round draft picks to Colorado for signing him away. The Flames disagreed with the NHL's interpretation, arguing the language in the memorandum of understanding the League and Union were operating under would have allowed for the signing, but conceded the argument was moot since Colorado matched the offer.

Kiprusoff returned from his injury on March 6 to lead Calgary to a 4–1 victory over the San Jose Sharks that was his 300th career victory with the Flames.  The win also moved the Flames' above .500 for the first time with a 9–8–4 record. However, the Flames lost their next three games, all on a California road trip, leaving the team in last place in the Western Conference. As the losses mounted, the media renewed speculation about Iginla's future in Calgary given his contract was set to expire at season's end and the NHL's April 3 trade deadline was rapidly approaching. A pair of home victories over the Detroit Red Wings and Nashville Predators – extending the team's home winning streak to six games – allowed the Flames to move back to an even record at 11–11–4.

Trade of Jarome Iginla

The Flames simultaneously had two extended streaks in the middle part of the season, as they won eight consecutive games at home, but suffered their ninth consecutive road loss in a 5–2 defeat at the hands of the Columbus Blue Jackets on March 22 and fell out of playoff contention. As the trade deadline approached, national media outlets reported that Iginla, who had a clause in his contract preventing the Flames from moving him to another team without his permission, had given the organization a list of four teams to which he would accept a trade: the Chicago Blackhawks, Los Angeles Kings, Boston Bruins or Pittsburgh Penguins. Amidst the trade rumours, Iginla scored the game-winning goal in what was ultimately his last home game as a Flame, a 3–2 victory over the St. Louis Blues on March 24.

The Flames held Iginla out of their March 27 game against the Colorado Avalanche as a trade appeared imminent. Aaron Ward, an analyst for The Sports Network (TSN) reported via "multiple-sources" that Iginla had been dealt to the Bruins, however the Flames revealed following the game that he had instead been dealt to the Penguins in exchange for Pittsburgh's first round selection at the 2013 NHL Entry Draft and college prospects Kenneth Agostino and Ben Hanowski. Boston general manager Peter Chiarelli was left disappointed as he believed he had completed a deal earlier in the day.  However, Feaster later told Chiarelli that Iginla preferred Pittsburgh, and that the team honoured his wishes. Iginla stated that the opportunity to play alongside Sidney Crosby, with whom he teamed up to score the gold-medal winning goal at the 2010 Winter Olympics, was too important to pass up.

The deal marked the end of an era for the Flames. In his 17 years in Calgary, Iginla became the face of the franchise, and was considered the greatest player in the team's history.  Iginla left Calgary as the franchise leader in games played (1,219), goals (525), points (1,095), multi-goal games (95) and game-winning goals (83).

Late season
Trade rumours followed Kiprusoff as well, despite his reluctance to leave Calgary following the birth of his second child. The Flames gave the Toronto Maple Leafs permission to speak with Kiprusoff's agent to see if the team could convince the goaltender to accept a trade.  According to Feaster however, Kiprusoff told Toronto that "Miikka was clear that he didn't want to lead Toronto on, that he didn't want to go there if his heart wasn't 100 per cent set on it and committed to it", therefore the Flames agreed to honour Kiprusoff's request to remain in Calgary.

Without Iginla and top defenceman Jay Bouwmeester, who was dealt to the St. Louis Blues, the team continued to struggle, particularly on the road.  The Flames set a franchise record for consecutive losses, enduring 13 consecutive defeats away from the Saddledome before ending the streak against the Colorado Avalanche with a 3–1 victory on April 8.

Following an embarrassing 8–2 loss on home ice to the Edmonton Oilers, the Flames' younger prospects asserted themselves in an April 13 game in Edmonton in which Sven Baertschi scored his first goal of the season and Max Reinhart the first of his NHL career to hand their provincial rivals a 4–1 defeat that practically eliminated the Oilers from playoff contention. Ben Hanowski, one of the players acquired in the Iginla trade, made his NHL debut late in the season following the conclusion of his college season, scoring a goal in his first game.

Kiprusoff's future was a late-season storyline, and while the goaltender himself refused to confirm or deny speculation it would be his last season in the NHL, his final home game of the season was viewed by the fans as a celebration of his career.  The crowd chanted his name and gave him a long standing ovation following a 32-save performance in a 3–1 victory over the Anaheim Ducks.

A three-game road losing streak to end the season left the Flames with the sixth-worst record in the League. Finishing with a 19–25–4 record, the Flames placed fourth in the Northwest Division, 13th in the Western Conference and missed the playoffs for the fourth consecutive season.

Three Flames players joined the roster of their respective countries at the 2013 World Championship. Defenceman T. J. Brodie, who was praised by Head Coach Hartley as one of the team's top performers during the NHL season, joined Team Canada.  Fellow defenceman Chris Butler played for Team USA, and forward Jiri Hudler played with the Czech Republic.  Mikael Backlund, whose performance during the season was also praised, hoped to join the Swedish roster, but after playing the final games of the season despite a fractured foot, was not medically cleared to play in the World Championship.

Post-season

The Saddledome was flooded as part of the 2013 Alberta floods in mid June 2013, at the tail end of the Stanley Cup playoffs.

Standings

Schedule and results

Regular season

Player statistics
Final stats *

Skaters
Note: GP = Games played; G = Goals; A = Assists; Pts = Points; +/− = Plus/minus; PIM = Penalty minutes

Goaltenders
Note: GP = Games played; TOI = Time on ice (minutes); W = Wins; L = Losses; OT = Overtime losses; GA = Goals against; GAA= Goals against average; SA= Shots against; SV= Saves; Sv% = Save percentage; SO= Shutouts

†Denotes player spent time with another organization before joining Flames. Stats reflect time with the Flames only.
‡Traded mid-season

Awards and honours

Awards

Milestones

Transactions

Player re-signings

Trades

Additions and subtractions

Draft picks

The Flames entered the 2012 NHL Entry Draft with the 14th overall pick. They did not use it, instead trading the pick to the Buffalo Sabres for their first round selection, 21st overall, and a second round selection, 42nd overall. With the 21st overall pick, the Flames chose centre Mark Jankowski from Stanstead College, in Quebec's high school program.  The pick was considered "off the board", as Calgary selected Jankowski much higher than scouts predicted.  Jankowksi's rating by scouting services had been rising however, and the Flames were convinced that he would not be available to them when they made their second round selection.  Assistant general manager John Weisbrod, who made the pick, said Jankowski was the most physically talented player available in the draft, while general manager Jay Feaster predicted that he could become the best player taken in the draft.

Statistics are updated to the end of the 2014–15 NHL season. † denotes player was on an NHL roster in 2014–15.

Abbotsford Heat
The Flames' top minor league affiliate, the Abbotsford Heat of the American Hockey League (AHL) finished the 2012–13 season with a 34–32–4–6 record and failed to qualify for the Calder Cup playoffs. Goaltender Barry Brust set an AHL record by playing 268 minutes, 17 seconds without allowing a goal, breaking the previous mark of 249:51 set in 1957 by Johnny Bower.

The future of the franchise in Abbotsford was the subject of speculation during the season as the Heat lost $1.9 million during the season and finished 28th of 30 teams in attendance.  The losses by the team reached nearly $5.5 million in the four years of the Heat's existence. Efforts, driven by the Vancouver Canucks, were made to see the Canucks purchase an AHL affiliate and move it into Abbotsford, while the Flames' affiliate would relocate to Utica, New York. The City of Abbotsford, however, was unable to complete a deal with the Canucks that would allow for the switch in time for the 2013–14 AHL season.  As a consequence, the Flames' affiliation was left unchanged.

References

Calgary Flames seasons
Calgary Flames season, 2012-13
Cal
Calgary Flames
Calgary Flames